Pritt is a surname. Notable persons with the name include:

Charlotte Pritt (born 1949), American politician
Denis Pritt (1877–1972), British politician
Emily Pritt (active 2009), American athlete
Frank Pritt (1940–2015), American businessman 
Julia Pritt (1932–2010), American philanthropist
Roman Pritt (active 2015), American Samoan rugby league player
Ryan Pritt (born 1986), American sports announcer
Walbanke Ashby Pritt (1897–1928), British military aviator